Banka is one of the thirty-eight districts of the state of Bihar in India. The district headquarters of Banka is situated in Banka town. The district was established on 21 February 1991.

History

Banka is the homeland of the revolutionary Satish Prasad Jha, one of seven martyrs who hoisted the flag of India at the Secretariat building near Patna on 11 August 1942. Jha was born in Kharhara near Dhakamod. Bhubaneswar Mishra, a noted regional revolutionary from village Faga has contributed a lot in the freedom movement. He was sentenced to life imprisonment for killing many cruel British forces. Banka has been an attractive destination for veteran socialists. Madhu Limaye represented the Banka Lok Sabha constituency twice. George Fernandes and Raj Narain also contested the parliamentary election in this constituency. There were also a number of veteran leaders of the Indian National Congress: Vindhyavasini Devi, MLA (1957–1967); Shakuntala Devi, ex MP; ex-chief minister of Bihar Chandrashekhar Singh, Chaturbhuj Singh Ex. MLA; ex-Rajya Sabha MP Kamakhya Prasad Singh, ex-MP Manorama Singh; and ex-MLA Jai Prakash Mishra. Digvijay Singh (14 November 1955 – 24 June 2010) was an independent who represented Banka in the Lok Sabha, the lower house of the Indian Parliament. Banka played a vital role in the freedom of India.

Banka became a district on 21 February 1991.

Digvijay Singh served as a Member of the Parliament of India five times – three times in the Lok Sabha (1998, 1999, and 2009) and two times in the Rajya Sabha (1990 and 2004). He served as Union Minister of State during the Atal Bihari Vajpayee government (1999–2004) and the Chandra Shekhar government (1990–1991). He was also a successful sports administrator, having served as president of the National Rifle Association of India since 1999. He was one of the three (George Fernandes, Digvijay Singh, and Nitish Kumar) founding members of the Samta Party. Now, Gridhari Yadav is the member of parliament from this constituency.

Geography

The district, part of Bhagalpur division, has its headquarters in Banka town.

Chanan is the main river of Banka. Barua is the second main river near Dubaa village in Banka.

Politics 
Banka is represented in the Parliament of India by Giridhari Yadav who won by a margin of 2,00,532 votes.

|}

Economy
Banka is gradually becoming a religious tourism hotspot for Hinduism and Jainism. Old Mandar Parvat (also known as Mandarachal Parvat in Puran) is home to many religious attractions. A Jain temple at the summit, in close proximity to a Vishnu temple, is a sign of religious tolerance. Every year in January, Bounsi Mela is organised, which depicts the village life of the Mandar region. A Ratha-Yatra procession of Lord Madhusudanah occurs every year on the same day as the Ratha-Yatra procession in Puri. Fourteenth-century Vaishnava saint Chaitanya Mahaprabhu started this Ratha-Yatra during his visit to Mandar.

Banka is a largely agrarian economy and is considered the "rice bowl" of Bihar. The main crops are rice, wheat, corn, and lentils. The Amarpur belt produces sugar cane and is home to gur sugar mills.

An issue for many smaller village industries in Bihar is the lack of branding for products. High-quality, locally produced goods, even in large volumes, contribute to lower earnings for business owners because of a lack of awareness of more profitable business practices.

Banka is strategically located near the source of raw materials for heavy industries. Its proximity to Jharkhand (bordering Deoghar, Dumka, and Godda) and the River Chandan makes it a very strong contender for coal-based power plant investment and other heavy industry. There is a 4000 MW thermal power plant is planned in Kakwara village. Abhijeet Group has planned to built a 1320 MW thermal power plant at Baunsi. Ericsson Power Ltd has planned to set up a 1320 MW thermal power plant at Prabhawati Nagar. Dalmia Power has planned to set up a 1320 MW coal-based thermal power project in Dona village.
In 2006, the Indian government named Banka one of the country's 250 most backward districts (out of a total of 640). It is one of the 38 districts in Bihar currently receiving funds from the Backward Regions Grant Fund Programme (BRGF).

Education 
Banka district has one Government college, PBS College.

Other colleges and universities include DNS College, Pt Tarni Jha Women College, and Shyama Charan Vidyapeeth.

Subdivisions and blocks
The district comprises only one subsdivision, Banka, which is further divided into eleven blocks: Banka, Amarpur, Shambhuganj, Belhar, Fullidumar, Katoria, Chandan, Baunsi, Barahat, Dhoraiya, and Rajoun.

Transport
A railway line connects the existing Bhagalpur with Jasidih and Rampurhat, which is well-connected to Howrah. Banka is also connected to Patna, the capital of Bihar, by a dedicated Express train.

Demographics

According to the 2011 Indian census, Banka district has a population of 2,034,763, This gives it a ranking of 228th in India (out of a total of 640). Its population growth rate from 2001-2011 was 26.14%. Banka has a sex ratio of 907 females for every 1000 males, and a literacy rate of 60.12%. 3.50% of the population lives in urban areas. Scheduled Castes and Scheduled Tribes made up 12.18% and 4.44% of the population respectively.

In the 2001 Indian census, it had a population of 1,608,773. There were 1,489,352 Hindus and 100,051 Muslims (8.85%).

Languages

At the time of the 2011 Indian census, 8.32% of the population in the district spoke Hindi, 4.20% Santali, and 4.03% Urdu as their first language. 82.05% of the population spoke language classified as 'Others' under Hindi on the census. The local dialect is Angika, sometimes regarded as a Maithili dialect.

Languages used in the district include Angika, an Indo-Aryan language written in the Tirhuta Script and spoken by at least 725,000 people in southeastern Bihar.

Famous people
Shahid Mahendra Gop
Giridhari Yadav

Culture
A temple dedicated to the Hindu goddess Durga is located in Banka. Every year during Durga Puja, devotees from many parts of India visit this temple. The management of the Narshimha temple is under a trust. Another temple, Avantika Nath, is located at the bottom of Mandar Parbat. The Avantika Nath Temple Trust, founded by the late Babu Biro Singh of the village of Sabalpur, maintains the temple. A temple of Lord Shiva is in Jethore hill near Chanan River. The literal meaning of Jethore is "jyesth" meaning elder Gaur means brother of Deoghar temple. Maa Kali Mandir in Kamalpur village is another temple. A Mahalakshmi temple is located in front of Paapharni Pond.

Recently, Lakshminarayan Temple was built in the centre of Paapharni through the contributions of locals. It is managed by a trust headed by Fateh Bahadur Singh of erstwhile Sabalpur state.  east of Rajoun village Mahada is situated, which has goddesses Durga Mandir and Kali Mandir, and god Shiva Mandir.

The district is known for its rich tribal culture and its handicrafts and handlooms. The homemade Khadi and silk of the area are popular. Most of the raw silk cocoon is produced in Katoria; in fact, major part of the raw materials required for silk industry in Bhagalpur is supplied from Katoria.

Tourism
This place is related to the three Kalyanka-Tup (penance), Keval Gyan (omniscience), & Moksha of Bhagawan Vasupujya. It means that this is the place where Vasupujya Swami accepted penance, achieved the supernatural knowledge and finally got salvation. Moolnayak of this temple is a coral-colored idol of Lord Vasupujya in Padmasana posture. A 5 feet tall statue of Vasupoojya is also present here. The temple also has a Dharamshala equipped with modern facilities.

Flora and fauna
The district has some forested area under Banka, Bounsi Katoriya forest ranges. The wood of Banka range lies on the hill slopes, those in the other two ranges lie in the undulating land. Among the prominent variety of trees in forested areas are the Sal which is usually found associated with Abuns, Asan, Kendu and Mahua. Tasar worms are reared on Asan trees. Some other trees are Bahera, Kadam, Amaltas. Among the specials of the Acacia are Babul, Sirish, and Sain Babul. Among the fruit trees, those of Mango and Jackfruit are common. Plantains, date plants, Plums, and Blackberry are some of the other important fruit trees.

Monkeys are common in the district, particularly the Hanuman, as well as Jackal, Deer, Lion, Bear, Leopards, and Elephants. Among the latter are Barsingha and Sambar. Wild geese, Duck, Leel, and Quail are some of the game birds inhabiting the district. Peacocks, Parrots, Hawks, and Doves are other birds found in Katoriya/Chandan forest. Sparrows, Crows and Vultures are also common.

Several kinds of fish, such as Rohu, Katla, Boari, Tengra, Bachwa, Jhinga, and Pothi, are found.

References

External links
 Official website

 
Districts of Bihar
Bhagalpur division